Udena Wijerathna is a Western Province Provincial Councillor in Sri Lanka. He belongs to the United National Party.

Early childhood

Udena who was educated at Nalanda College, Colombo is the youngest son of Mahendra Wijerathna former Minister of Livestock Development, Milk Production and Deputy Minister of Trade and Shipping. He is also the grand nephew of Philip Gunawardena & Robert Gunawardena and nephew of former Hiriyala MP S.B. Herath. His only sister is Dr Maheshi Wijerathna who is a Specialist Neuro Surgeon attached to Sri Jayawardenapura General Hospital.

Politics

In 1991 Provincial Council elections Udena received most no of preferential votes in Sri Lanka and became the President of the Provincial Council in Mirigama. In 1998 he became a Provincial Council Minister obtaining the 3rd place in elections.

See also
List of political families in Sri Lanka
Gunawardena (Boralugoda Ralahamy)
 2009 Provincial Council Election

References

WIJERATNE - MAHENDRA (MP for Mirigama)

Sri Lankan Buddhists
Provincial councillors of Sri Lanka
Living people
United National Party politicians
Members of the Western Provincial Council
Alumni of Nalanda College, Colombo
Sinhalese politicians
Year of birth missing (living people)